The Palais des papes of Sorgues is the first papal residence built by Avignon Papacy to XIVth siecle. Its construction was ordered by John XXII and preceded in 18 years to the Palais des papes. This luxurious residence had served as a model for the construction of residences of cardinals in Avignon. It remains today as ruins, because the palace was dismantled during the French Revolution by the builders that the town of Sorgues had sold.

Buildings and structures in Vaucluse